In the mathematical subject of geometric group theory, the Culler–Vogtmann Outer space or just Outer space of a free group Fn is a topological space consisting of the so-called "marked metric graph structures" of volume 1 on Fn. The Outer space, denoted Xn or CVn, comes equipped with a natural action of the group of outer automorphisms Out(Fn) of Fn. The Outer space was introduced in a 1986 paper of Marc Culler and Karen Vogtmann, and it serves as a free group analog of the Teichmüller space of a hyperbolic surface. Outer space is used to study homology and cohomology groups of Out(Fn) and to obtain information about algebraic, geometric and dynamical properties of Out(Fn), of its subgroups and individual outer automorphisms of Fn. The space Xn can also be thought of as the set of  isometry types of minimal free discrete isometric actions of Fn on Fn on R-trees T such that the quotient metric graph T/Fn has volume 1.

History
The Outer space  was introduced in a 1986 paper of Marc Culler and Karen Vogtmann, inspired by analogy with the Teichmüller space of a hyperbolic surface.

Formal definition

Marked metric graphs
Let n ≥ 2. For the free group Fn fix a "rose" Rn, that is a wedge, of n circles wedged at a vertex v, and fix an isomorphism between Fn and the fundamental group 1(Rn, v) of Rn. From this point on we identify Fn and 1(Rn, v) via this isomorphism.

A marking on Fn consists of a homotopy equivalence f : Rn → Γ where Γ is a finite connected graph without degree-one and degree-two vertices. Up to a (free) homotopy, f is uniquely determined by the isomorphism f# : , that is by an isomorphism 

A metric graph is a finite connected graph  together with the assignment to every topological edge e of Γ of a positive real number L(e) called the length of e.
The volume of a metric graph is the sum of the lengths of its topological edges.

A marked metric graph structure on Fn consists of a marking f : Rn → Γ together with a metric graph structure L on Γ.

Two marked metric graph structures f1 : Rn → Γ1 and f2 : Rn → Γ2 are equivalent if there exists an isometry θ : Γ1 → Γ2 such that, up to free homotopy, we have θ o f1 = f2.

The Outer space Xn consists of equivalence classes of all the volume-one marked metric graph structures on Fn.

Weak topology on the Outer space

Open simplices
Let f : Rn → Γ where Γ is a marking and let k be the number of topological edges in Γ. We order the edges of Γ as e1, ..., ek. Let

be the standard (k − 1)-dimensional open simplex in Rk.

Given f, there is a natural map j : Δk → Xn, where for x = (x1, ..., xk) ∈ Δk, the point j(x) of Xn is given by the marking f together with the metric graph structure L on Γ such that L(ei) = xi for i = 1, ..., k.

One can show that j is in fact an injective map, that is, distinct points of Δk correspond to non-equivalent marked metric graph structures on Fn.

The set j(Δk) is called open simplex in Xn corresponding to f and is denoted S(f). By construction, Xn is the union of open simplices corresponding to all markings on Fn. Note that two open simplices in Xn either are disjoint or coincide.

Closed simplices
Let f : Rn → Γ where Γ is a marking and let k be the number of topological edges in Γ. As before, we order the edges of Γ as e1, ..., ek.

The map j : Δk → Xn extends to a map h : Δk′ → Xn as follows. For x in Δk put h(x) = j(x).

It can be shown that for every marking f the map h : Δk′ → Xn is still injective. The image of h is called the closed simplex in Xn corresponding to f and is denoted by S′(f). Every point in Xn belongs to only finitely many closed simplices and a point of Xn represented by a marking f : Rn → Γ where the graph Γ is tri-valent belongs to a unique closed simplex in Xn, namely S′(f).

The weak topology on the Outer space Xn is defined by saying that a subset C of Xn is closed if and only if for every marking f : Rn → Γ the set h−1(C) is closed in Δk′. In particular, the map h : Δk′ → Xn is a topological embedding.

Points of Outer space as actions on trees
Let x be a point in Xn given by a marking f : Rn → Γ with a volume-one metric graph structure L on Γ. Let T be the universal cover of Γ. Thus T is a simply connected graph, that is T is a topological tree. We can also lift the metric structure L to T by giving every edge of T the same length as the length of its image in Γ. This turns T into a metric space (T, d) which is a real tree. The fundamental group 1(Γ) acts on T by covering transformations which are also isometries of (T, d), with the quotient space T/1(Γ) = Γ. Since the induced homomorphism f# is an isomorphism between Fn = 1(Rn) and 1(Γ), we also obtain an isometric action of Fn on T with T/Fn = Γ. This action is free and discrete. Since Γ is a finite connected graph with no degree-one vertices, this action is also minimal, meaning that T has no proper Fn-invariant subtrees.

Moreover, every minimal free and discrete isometric action of Fn on a real tree with the quotient being a metric graph of volume one arises in this fashion from some point x of Xn. This defines a bijective correspondence between Xn and the set of equivalence classes of minimal free and discrete isometric actions of Fn on a real trees with volume-one quotients. Here two such actions of Fn on real trees T1 and T2 are equivalent if there exists an Fn-equivariant isometry between T1 and T2.

Length functions
Give an action of Fn on a real tree T as above, one can define the translation length function associate with this action:

For g ≠ 1 there is a (unique) isometrically embedded copy of R in T, called the axis of g, such that g acts on this axis by a translation of magnitude . For this reason  is called the translation length of g. For any g, u in Fn we have , that is the function  is constant on each conjugacy class in G.

In the marked metric graph model of Outer space translation length functions can be interpreted as follows. Let T in Xn be represented by a marking f : Rn → Γ with a volume-one metric graph structure L on Γ. Let g ∈ Fn = 1(Rn). First push g forward via f# to get a closed loop in Γ and then tighten this loop to an immersed circuit in Γ. The L-length of this circuit is the translation length  of g.

A basic general fact from the theory of group actions on real trees says that a point of the Outer space is uniquely determined by its translation length function. Namely if two trees with minimal free isometric actions of Fn define equal translation length functions on Fn then the two trees are Fn-equivariantly isometric. Hence the map  from Xn to the set of R-valued functions on Fn is injective.

One defines the length function topology or axes topology on Xn as follows. For every T in Xn, every finite subset K of Fn and every ε > 0 let

In the length function topology for every T in Xn a basis of neighborhoods of T in Xn is given by the family VT(K, ε) where K is a finite subset of Fn and where ε > 0.

Convergence of sequences in the length function topology can be characterized as follows. For T in Xn and a sequence Ti in Xn we have  if and only if for every g in Fn we have

Gromov topology

For the formal definition of the Gromov topology see.

Coincidence of the weak, the length function and Gromov topologies
An important basic result states that the Gromov topology, the weak topology and the length function topology on Xn coincide.

Action of Out(Fn) on Outer space
The group Out(Fn) admits a natural right action by homeomorphisms on Xn.

First we define the action of the automorphism group Aut(Fn) on Xn. Let α ∈ Aut(Fn) be an automorphism of Fn. 
Let x be a point of Xn given by a marking f : Rn → Γ with a volume-one metric graph structure L on Γ. Let τ : Rn → Rn be a homotopy equivalence whose induced homomorphism at the fundamental group level is the automorphism α of Fn = 1(Rn). The element xα of Xn is given by the marking f ∘ τ : Rn → Γ with the metric structure L on Γ. That is, to get xα from x we simply precompose the marking defining x with τ.

In the real tree model this action can be described as follows. Let T in Xn be a real tree with a minimal free and discrete co-volume-one isometric action of Fn. Let α ∈ Aut(Fn). As a metric space, Tα is equal to T. The action of Fn is twisted by α. Namely, for any t in T and g in Fn we have:

At the level of translation length functions the tree Tα is given as:

One then checks that for the above action of Aut(Fn) on Outer space Xn the subgroup of inner automorphisms Inn(Fn) is contained in the kernel of this action, that is every inner automorphism acts trivially on Xn. It follows that the action of Aut(Fn) on Xn quotients through to an action of Out(Fn) = Aut(Fn)/Inn(Fn) on Xn. namely, if φ ∈ Out(Fn) is an outer automorphism of Fn and if α in Aut(Fn) is an actual automorphism representing φ then for any x in Xn we have xφ = xα.

The right action of Out(Fn) on Xn can be turned into a left action via a standard conversion procedure. Namely, for φ ∈ Out(Fn) and x in Xn set
φx = xφ−1.

This left action of Out(Fn) on Xn is also sometimes considered in the literature although most sources work with the right action.

Moduli space
The quotient space Mn = Xn/Out(Fn) is the moduli space which consists of isometry types of finite connected graphs Γ without degree-one and degree-two vertices, with fundamental groups isomorphic to Fn (that is, with the first Betti number equal to n) equipped with volume-one metric structures. The quotient topology on Mn is the same as that given by the Gromov–Hausdorff distance between metric graphs representing points of Mn. The moduli space Mn is not compact and the "cusps" in Mn arise from decreasing towards zero lengths of edges for homotopically nontrivial subgraphs (e.g. an essential circuit) of a metric graph Γ.

Basic properties and facts about Outer space
 Outer space Xn is contractible and the action of Out(Fn) on Xn is properly discontinuous, as was proved by Culler and Vogtmann in their original 1986 paper where Outer space was introduced. 
 The space Xn has topological dimension 3n − 4. The reason is that if Γ is a finite connected graph without degree-one and degree-two vertices with fundamental group isomorphic to Fn, then Γ has at most 3n − 3 edges and it has exactly 3n − 3 edges when Γ is trivalent. Hence the top-dimensional open simplex in Xn has dimension 3n − 4.
 Outer space Xn contains a specific deformation retract Kn of Xn, called the spine of Outer space. The spine Kn has dimension 2n − 3, is Out(Fn)-invariant and has compact quotient under the action of Out(Fn).

Unprojectivized Outer space
The unprojectivized Outer space  consists of equivalence classes of all marked metric graph structures on Fn where the volume of the metric graph in the marking is allowed to be any positive real number. The space  can also be thought of as the set of all free minimal discrete isometric actions of Fn on R-trees, considered up to Fn-equivariant isometry. The unprojectivized Outer space inherits the same structures that  has, including the coincidence of the three topologies (Gromov, axes, weak), and an -action.

In particular,  is also contractible.

Projectivized Outer space
The space  is equipped with the quotient topology. For a tree  its projective equivalence class is denoted .

A key observation is that the map  is an -equivariant homeomorphism.

Lipschitz distance
The Lipschitz distance, named for Rudolf Lipschitz, for Outer space corresponds to the Thurston metric in Teichmüller space.
 and 
This is an asymmetric metric (also sometimes called a quasimetric), i.e. it only fails symmetry . The symmetric Lipschitz metric normally denotes:

Where  is the finite set of conjugacy classes in Fn which correspond to embeddings of a simple loop, a figure of eight, or a barbell into  via the marking (see the diagram).

The stretching factor also equals the minimal Lipschitz constant of a homotopy equivalence carrying over the marking, i.e.

Applications and generalizations
It is known that the Gromov topology and the axes topology on the space of irreducible actions coincide, so the closure can be understood in either sense.
 Analogs and generalizations of the Outer space have been developed for free products, for right-angled Artin groups, for the so-called deformation spaces of group actions and in some other contexts.
 A base-pointed version of Outer space, called Auter space, for marked metric graphs with base-points, was constructed by Hatcher and Vogtmann in 1998.

See also
 Geometric group theory
 Mapping class group
 Train track map
 Out(Fn)

References

Further reading
 Mladen Bestvina, The topology of Out(Fn). Proceedings of the International Congress of Mathematicians, Vol. II (Beijing, 2002), pp. 373–384, Higher Education Press, Beijing, 2002; .
 Karen Vogtmann, On the geometry of outer space. Bulletin of the American Mathematical Society 52 (2015), no. 1, 27–46.
 

Geometric group theory
Geometric topology